Everton F.C. is a professional association football club based in Liverpool, England. The club was founded in 1878, but did not participate in competitive football until 1887, when they first took part in the FA Cup. The club has had 26 permanent managers, though this role was previously filled by the club secretary.

William Edward Barclay was the club secretary for Everton's first season in the newly founded Football League but was replaced the following season by Dick Molyneux. Molyneux brought the first title to the club, winning the First Division in the 1890–91 season. He managed the club for eleven seasons before being replaced in 1901 by William C. Cuff who brought further success in the shape of another League title in the 1914–15 season and the club's first FA Cup, a 1–0 victory over Newcastle United at Crystal Palace. Between the First and Second World Wars, the club enjoyed its first prolonged period of success under the guidance of Thomas H. McIntosh. Despite relegation to the Second Division in the 1928–29 season, he led the team to back-to-back Second and First Division championships in 1931 and 1932, the 1933 FA Cup and two successful appearances in the Charity Shield. A fifth league title was secured in 1938–39 while the club was run by committee, while in 1939 Theo Kelly was appointed as the club's first manager after the succession of secretaries and senior coaches who were responsible for team selection.

With the pre-War team dispersed, the club struggled to reassert its dominance in the late 1940s and eventually suffered relegation to the Second Division under Cliff Britton in the 1950–51 season. After finishing second in the 1953–54 season, the club returned to the top tier of English football, the level at which they have played ever since. In 1961, the club appointed Harry Catterick as manager who led the club to the league title again in both the 1962–63 and 1969–70 seasons, with the league successes punctuated by another FA Cup triumph, this time a 3–2 victory over Sheffield Wednesday at Wembley.

The club failed to achieve further league or cup success until the appointment of former Everton player Howard Kendall in 1981. Kendall initially proved unpopular with the Goodison Park crowd, but this was not to last as he led Everton to their most successful season ever winning the European Cup Winners' Cup and the First Division in the 1984–85 season. Following success in the Charity Shield twice and another League championship in 1986–87, Kendall resigned from Everton to manage Spanish side Athletic Bilbao. He returned for two further spells during the 1990s (1990–1993 & 1997–1998) but without such success. Former Everton player and Oldham Athletic manager Joe Royle was appointed in 1994 following the disastrous reign of Mike Walker (1994 for 10 months) winning the FA Cup in the same season. Injury crises and players such as Andrei Kanchelskis being sold led to Royle's resignation in March 1997. Former Rangers manager, Walter Smith, took the position in August 1998, but he failed to transfer the success he had achieved in Scotland. With three bottom-half finishes in his first three seasons, and facing relegation in the 2001–02 season, Smith was sacked. He was replaced by fellow Scot David Moyes who led the club back into European football, finishing fifth in the 2006–07 season. Under Moyes's 11-year managership, the club prospered, qualifying for the Champions League in 2005 and reaching the FA Cup final in 2009. However, the long-awaited trophy that his leadership deserved eluded him. Having stalled on contract renewal discussions, and following the announcement of Sir Alex Ferguson's retirement as manager of Manchester United at the end of the 2013 season, Moyes succeeded him at Old Trafford.

Moyes's replacement was Roberto Martínez, the club's first manager from outside Britain and Ireland. After three seasons, the last of which saw Everton return their worst home record in the club's 138-year history, Martínez was sacked in May 2016 and replaced by  Ronald Koeman a month later. Koeman was sacked in October 2017 after 16 months in the job following a 5–2 defeat to Arsenal that had dropped the club into the relegation zone. Sam Allardyce was named as Koeman's permanent replacement in November 2017. He was replaced at the end of 2017–18 by Marco Silva after finishing in 8th Silva was sacked in December 2019 following a 5–2 defeat to Liverpool, with Duncan Ferguson taking over as interim manager until the arrival of Carlo Ancelotti on 21 December 2019. Ancelotti would depart the club at the end of the 2020–21 season, returning to coach Real Madrid. On 30 June 2021, Rafael Benítez was named as Ancelotti's successor. He himself would be relieved of his duties on 16 January 2022 following a defeat to Norwich City which left Everton in 15th in the league. Benítez's six-and-a-half month tenure meant that he was the shortest-serving permanent manager in Everton's history. He was replaced temporarily with Duncan Ferguson as caretaker manager again that same day, playing and losing one game against Aston Villa, before being replaced by Frank Lampard on 31 January 2022. Lampard just about kept Everton up, but after a very below-par first half of the following season, alongside unrest from fans against the board, he was sacked on 23 January 2023 with the Toffeemen sitting bottom alongside Southampton with only 15 points, and he was replaced by Sean Dyche a week later on 30 January 2023.

Managers
As of match played 18 March 2023. Only professional, competitive matches are counted.

References

External links
  – all dates taken from this site reflect the manager's first and last games rather than their dates of appointment and departure.

Managers
 
Everton
Managers